Sarah Mahoka (March 23, 1966 – February 17, 2022) was a Zimbabwean politician.

Mahoka was a member of parliament for Hurungwe East.

Death
Mahoka died February 17, 2022, as the result of an automobile accident. She was travelling towards Karoi when a haulage truck that was travelling towards Harare allegedly encroached into her lane resulting in a head-on collision.

References

1966 births
2022 deaths
Zimbabwean politicians
ZANU–PF politicians
Road incident deaths in Zimbabwe
Members of the National Assembly of Zimbabwe
People from Mashonaland West Province